Hugh O'Brian Youth Leadership  (HOBY) is an organization dedicated "to inspiring and developing our global community of youth and volunteers to a life dedicated to leadership, service, and innovation."

History
Founded in 1958 by American actor Hugh O'Brian, the first youth leadership seminar was held in Los Angeles, California, and was held once a year until 1967.  Since then, the HOBY program has spread to over 70 locations in all fifty U.S. states, and 19 countries and regions.

Program
To attend seminars in the United States, a student must be chosen by their high school out of all students in that school's sophomore class. At the seminars, students participate in programs designed to enhance their leadership and teamwork skills.  Students also meet and converse with leaders in their community in fields such as volunteerism, media, education, philanthropy, and politics, among others. They also discuss the day and their activities in small groups, as well as their life and feelings.  They also participate in energizing cheers in between panels and in any free time they have. 

In late July, HOBY has a World Leadership Congress (WLC), which is hosted in a major U.S. city. The WLC is attended by hundreds of HOBY students from all over the world. Since its inception, over 500,000 students have attended HOBY programs.

Albert Schweitzer Leadership Award

The Albert Schweitzer Leadership Award is presented to individuals who have distinguished themselves through service to mankind and who have contributed significantly through leading, educating and motivating youth.

Partial list of past recipients of the Albert Schweitzer Leadership Award include:

 Talib Hamid Al-Bayati, Former UN Iraqi ambassador
 Former Secretary of State Madeleine Albright
 Bill Austin
 George H. W. Bush
 John Wm. Butler
 Lynne and Richard Cheney
 Secretary of State and former First Lady Hillary Clinton
 Elizabeth and Robert Dole
 David A. Fergusson
 President and Mrs. Gerald R. Ford
 David Foster
 Lynn and Foster Friess
 Raisa and Mikhail Gorbachev
 Vice President and Mrs. Al Gore
 Doug Parker
 Lydia and Charlton Heston
 Dolores and Bob Hope
 J. Willard Marriott
 General Colin L. Powell (Ret.)
 President & Mrs. Ronald Reagan
 General H. Norman Schwarzkopf
 Ted Turner
 Former California Governor and Mrs. Pete Wilson

References

External links
 HOBY website
 HOBY Facts and Figures (PDF)
  
  Secretary of Education Arne Duncan thanking ambassadors for work done

Youth organizations based in Florida
Charities based in Florida